"Private" is a song by Australian singer songwriter Vera Blue, released on 17 February 2017 as the lead single from her second studio album, Perennial (2017). "Private" was certified gold in Australia in 2020.

Vera Blue told Triple J the song was written in April 2016 and is about "that fantasy of wanting someone you can't have… I find that's something everyone can relate to. There's that frustration from not being able to have something whether you fall for a friend or a celebrity..."

Reception
In a review of Perennial, Jessica Dale from The Music AU said "It’s short and sharp at two and half minutes. It’s a view into Pavey’s own fantasy world, playing on the concept of what she wants in her dreams verses what she knows is right in her reality."

Track listing 
Digital download

Charts

Certifications

Release history

References 

2016 songs
2017 singles
Vera Blue songs
Universal Music Australia singles
Songs written by Vera Blue